The meridian 102° west of Greenwich is a line of longitude that extends from the North Pole across the Arctic Ocean, North America, the Pacific Ocean, the Southern Ocean, and Antarctica to the South Pole.

The 102nd meridian west forms a great circle with the 78th meridian east.

In Canada, part of the border between the Northwest Territories and Nunavut is defined by the meridian, and part of the border between Saskatchewan and Manitoba runs about 400m west of the meridian. At the 60th parallel north, these borders form a (possible) quadripoint at the four corners of these provinces and territories. 102°W is the Second Meridian of Canada's Dominion Land Survey.

In the United States, the meridian formed the eastern border of the historic and extralegal Territory of Jefferson. The eastern border of Colorado with Nebraska and Kansas lies on the 25th meridian west from Washington, which lies a couple of miles west of the 102nd meridian west.

From Pole to Pole
Starting at the North Pole and heading south to the South Pole, the 102nd meridian west passes through:

{| class="wikitable plainrowheaders"
! scope="col" width="130" | Co-ordinates
! scope="col" | Country, territory or sea
! scope="col" | Notes
|-
| style="background:#b0e0e6;" | 
! scope="row" style="background:#b0e0e6;" | Arctic Ocean
| style="background:#b0e0e6;" |
|-
| style="background:#b0e0e6;" | 
! scope="row" style="background:#b0e0e6;" | Peary Channel
| style="background:#b0e0e6;" |
|-
| 
! scope="row" | 
| Nunavut — Ellef Ringnes Island
|-
| style="background:#b0e0e6;" | 
! scope="row" style="background:#b0e0e6;" | Danish Strait
| style="background:#b0e0e6;" |
|-
| 
! scope="row" | 
| Nunavut — King Christian Island
|-
| style="background:#b0e0e6;" | 
! scope="row" style="background:#b0e0e6;" | Unnamed waterbody
| style="background:#b0e0e6;" | Passing just west of Helena Island, Nunavut,  (at )
|-
| 
! scope="row" | 
| Nunavut — Bathurst Island
|-
| style="background:#b0e0e6;" | 
! scope="row" style="background:#b0e0e6;" | Erskine Inlet
| style="background:#b0e0e6;" |
|-
| 
! scope="row" | 
| Nunavut — Alexander Island and Bathurst Island
|-
| style="background:#b0e0e6;" | 
! scope="row" style="background:#b0e0e6;" | Parry Channel
| style="background:#b0e0e6;" | Viscount Melville Sound
|-
| 
! scope="row" | 
| Nunavut — Prince of Wales Island
|-
| style="background:#b0e0e6;" | 
! scope="row" style="background:#b0e0e6;" | M'Clintock Channel
| style="background:#b0e0e6;" |
|-
| 
! scope="row" | 
| Nunavut — Victoria Island
|-
| style="background:#b0e0e6;" | 
! scope="row" style="background:#b0e0e6;" | Albert Edward Bay
| style="background:#b0e0e6;" |
|-
| 
! scope="row" | 
| Nunavut — Victoria Island
|-
| style="background:#b0e0e6;" | 
! scope="row" style="background:#b0e0e6;" | Queen Maud Gulf
| style="background:#b0e0e6;" |
|-
| 
! scope="row" | 
| Nunavut — Qikiqtaryuaq
|-
| style="background:#b0e0e6;" | 
! scope="row" style="background:#b0e0e6;" | Queen Maud Gulf
| style="background:#b0e0e6;" |
|-valign="top"
| 
! scope="row" | 
|-valign="top"
| 
! scope="row" | 
| North Dakota South Dakota — from  Nebraska — from  Kansas — from  Oklahoma — from  Texas — from 
|-valign="top"
| 
! scope="row" | 
|-
| style="background:#b0e0e6;" | 
! scope="row" style="background:#b0e0e6;" | Pacific Ocean
| style="background:#b0e0e6;" |
|-
| style="background:#b0e0e6;" | 
! scope="row" style="background:#b0e0e6;" | Southern Ocean
| style="background:#b0e0e6;" |
|-
| 
! scope="row" | Antarctica
| Unclaimed territory
|-
|}

See also
101st meridian west
103rd meridian west

w102 meridian west
Borders of Nunavut
Borders of the Northwest Territories
Borders of Saskatchewan
Borders of Manitoba